The year 1919 was marked, in science fiction, by the following events.

Births and deaths

Births 
 October 3 : John Boyd, American writer (died 2013)
 October 15 : Edwin Charles Tubb, British writer (died 2010)
 November 26 : Frederik Pohl, American writer (died 2013)

Deaths

Events 
 Creation of the French review Sciences et Voyages.

Awards 
The main science-fiction Awards known at the present time did not exist at this time.

Literary releases

Novels 
 First publication of  Out of the Silence, by Erle Cox.

Stories collections

Short stories

Comics

Audiovisual outputs

Movies 
The Harry Houdini serial The Master Mystery featured the first robot in film, called the Automaton.

See also 
 1919 in science
 1918 in science fiction
 1920 in science fiction

References

Science fiction by year

science-fiction